Nick Rose (born February 11, 1988) is a Canadian professional box lacrosse goaltender for the Toronto Rock of the National Lacrosse League (NLL). Originally drafted 28th overall by the Rock in the 2008 NLL Entry Draft, he spent time with the Boston Blazers and Calgary Roughnecks before returning to Toronto in 2012.

Early life and education
Rose was born on February 11, 1988, in Orangeville, Ontario, Canada. His father Tony, a former lacrosse player, died when Rose was two years old and an arena was named in his honour.

Playing career

Minor
As a youth, Rose competed with the Orangeville Northmen Jr. A lacrosse team. He was the recipient of the 2007 Junior A Rookie of the Year Award. The following year, Rose was drafted in 3rd round, 28th overall by the Toronto Rock in the 2008 National Lacrosse League Entry Draft and later helped the Northmen clinch the 2009 Canadian Lacrosse Association’s Minto Cup, where he was also named MVP of the tournament.

Professional
In 2010, Rose made the Boston Blazers' opening night roster for the 2010 NLL season. He played his first career NLL game after Mike Poulin was traded to the Calgary Roughnecks and ended up playing a total of 22:05 minutes in his first year with the team. He returned to the Blazers for the 2011 season, before the team was dispersed.

Rose was drafted by the Calgary Roughnecks in the first round of the 2011 Boston Blazers Dispersal Draft. While with the Roughnecks, he played five games and registered 17 saves in two relief appearances. Rose was eventually traded to the Toronto Rock in March 2012 for a first-round pick in the 2014 NLL Entry Draft. He made his debut with the Rock on March 24, 2012, in a 13–7 win over the Rochester Knighthawks. Rose signed a one-year contract extension with the Rock on August 2, 2012. As the starting goaltender for the Rock, Rose went 6–8 in 2014 and 6–2 in 2015 as he led the team to the Champions Cup Finals. By 2016, Rose was named a finalist for the National Lacrosse League's Goaltender of the Year Award after ranking third in the NLL in goals against average and tied for sixth in wins with five. Rose later agreed to 3-year contract extension with the Rock on July 27, 2016.

The following year, Rose became the first goaltender in the NLL to score two goals in one season from his crease. At the conclusion of his three-year contract, Rose opted out of becoming an unrestricted free agent and signed a two-year extension with the Rock.

Heading into the 2023 NLL season, Inside Lacrosse named Rose the #3 best goalie in the NLL.

Statistics

NLL
Reference:

References

1988 births
Living people
Toronto Rock players
National Lacrosse League players
Lacrosse goaltenders
Calgary Roughnecks players
Canadian lacrosse players
Lacrosse people from Ontario
Boston Blazers players